Empress Myeongseong or Empress Myungsung (명성황후 민씨; 17 November 1851 – 8 October 1895), informally known as Empress Min, was the official wife of Gojong, the 26th king of Joseon and the first emperor of the Korean Empire. She was posthumously called Myeongseong, the Great Empress.

Empress Myeongseong was considered an obstacle by the government of Meiji Japan (明治政府) to its overseas expansion. However, she took a harsher stand against Japanese influence after the Heungseon Daewongun's failed rebellions that were intended to remove her from the political arena.

After Japan's victory in the First Sino-Japanese War, Joseon Korea came under the Japanese sphere of influence. The empress advocated stronger ties between Korea and Russia in an attempt to block Japanese influence in Korea. Miura Gorō, the Japanese Minister to Korea at that time and a retired army lieutenant-general, backed the faction headed by the Daewongun, whom he considered to be more sympathetic to Japanese interests.

In the early morning of 8 October 1895, the Hullyeondae Regiment, loyal to the Daewongun, attacked the Gyeongbokgung, overpowering its Royal Guards. Hullyeondae officers, led by Major Woo Beom-seon, then allowed a group of ronin, specifically recruited for this purpose, to infiltrate and assassinate the empress in the palace, under orders from Miura Gorō. The empress's assassination sparked international outrage.

Domestically, the assassination prompted anti-Japanese sentiment in Korea with the "Short Hair Act Order", facilitating the creation of the Eulmi Righteous Army and protests nationwide. Following the empress's assassination, Emperor Gojong and the crown prince (later Emperor Sunjong of Korea) fled to the Russian legation in 1896. This led to the general repeal of the Gabo Reform, which was under Japanese influence. In October 1897, King Gojong returned to Gyeongungung (modern-day Deoksugung). There, he proclaimed the founding of the Korean Empire.

Background

Clan tensions
In 1864, Cheoljong of Joseon died suddenly as the result of suspected foul play by the Andong Kim clan, an aristocratic and influential clan of the 19th century. Cheoljong was childless and had not appointed an heir. The Andong Kim clan had risen to power through intermarriage with the royal House of Yi. Queen Cheorin, Cheoljong's consort and a member of the Andong Kim clan, claimed the right to choose the next king, although traditionally the most senior Queen Dowager had the official authority to select the new king. Cheoljong's cousin, Grand Royal Dowager Sinjeong, the widow of Heonjong of Joseon's father of the Pungyang Jo clan, who too had risen to prominence by intermarriage with the Yi family, currently held this title.

Queen Sinjeong saw an opportunity to advance the cause of the Pungyang Jo clan, the only true rival of the Andong Kim clan in Korean politics. As Cheoljong succumbed to his illness, the Grand Royal Dowager Queen was approached by Yi Ha-eung, a distant descendant of King Injo (r.1623–1649), whose father was made an adoptive son of Prince Eunsin, a nephew of King Yeongjo (r.1724–1776).

The branch that Yi Ha-eung's family belonged to was an obscure line of descendants of the Yi clan, which survived the often deadly political intrigue that frequently embroiled the Joseon court by forming no affiliation with any factions. Yi Ha-eung himself was ineligible for the throne due to a law that dictated that any possible heir had to be part of the generation after the most recent incumbent of the throne, but his second son, Yi Myeongbok, was a possible successor to the throne.

The Pungyang Jo clan saw that Yi Myeongbok was only 12 years old and would not be able to rule in his own name until he came of age, and that they could easily influence Yi Ha-eung, who would be acting as regent for his son. As soon as news of Cheoljong's death reached Yi Ha-eung through his intricate network of spies in the palace, he and the Pungyang Jo clan took the hereditary royal seal (considered necessary for a legitimate reign to take place and aristocratic recognition to be received), effectively giving Queen Sinjeong absolute power to select the successor to the throne. By the time Cheoljong's death became a known fact, the Andong Kim clan was powerless to act according to law because the seal already lay in the hands of Grand Royal Dowager Queen Shinjeong.

In the autumn of 1864, Yi Myeong-bok was crowned as King Gojong of Joseon, with his father titled Heungseon Daewongun ( "Grand Internal Prince").

The strongly Confucian Heungseon Daewongun proved to be a capable and calculating leader in the early years of Gojong's reign. He abolished the old government institutions that had become corrupt under the rule of various clans, revised the law codes along with the household laws of the royal court and the rules of court ritual, and heavily reformed the military techniques of the royal armies. Within a few years, he was able to secure complete control of the court, and eventually receive the submission of the Pungyang Jo's while successfully disposing of the last of the Andong Kim's, whose corruption, he believed, was responsible for the country's decline in the 19th century.

Early life and family 
The future queen-consort was born into the aristocratic Yeoheung Min clan on 17 November 1851 within the House of Gamgodang in Seomrak Village, Geundong-myeon, Yeoheung (present-day Yeoju), Gyeonggi Province, where the clan originated.

The Yeoheung Min’s were a noble clan boasting many highly positioned bureaucrats in its illustrious past, princess consorts, as well as two queen consorts: Queen Wongyeong, the wife of Taejong of Joseon and mother of Sejong the Great, and Queen Inhyeon, the second wife of Sukjong of Joseon.

When her father Min Chi-rok was young, he studied under scholar Oh Hui-sang, and eventually married his daughter and first wife, Lady Oh of the Haeju Oh clan. However, Lady Oh died at the age of 36 in 1833 with no children. After mourning for three years, Min Chi-rok married Yi Gyu-nyeon's daughter, Lady Yi of the Hansan Yi clan, in 1836. She was the fourth child to Lady Yi. She had an older brother and two older sisters who died prior to her birth.

Before her marriage, the empress was known as the daughter of Min Chi-rok, Lady Min, or Min Ja-yeong. At age seven, she lost her father to an illness on 17 September 1858 while he was in Sado city. Lady Min was then raised by her mother and Min relatives for eight years until she moved to the palace and became queen. Ja-yeong worked with her mother while in living in Gamgodang for three years. In 1861, it was decided during King Cheoljong's 12th year of reign that Min Seung-ho, her mother-in-law's younger brother, would become her father's heir. 

When Lady Min became Queen Consort in 1866, her mother was given the royal title of "Internal Princess Consort Hanchang". Her father was given the royal title of "Internal Prince Yeoseong, Min Chi-rok", and after he died, he was appointed as "Yeonguijeong". Her father's first wife also given the royal title of "Internal Princess Consort Haeryeong" (Hangul: 해령부부인, Hanja: 海寧府夫人).

Her mother died from a bombing assassination in 1874, along with her adoptive older brother, Min Seung-ho.

Selection as queen consort 
When Gojong reached the age of 15, his father began to look through candidates for Gojong to marry. The Daewongun sought someone with no close relatives who would harbor political ambitions and who came from a noble lineage, allowing him to justify his choice. After rejecting numorus candidates, the Daewongun's wife, Grand Internal Princess Consort Sunmok (known at the time as Grand Internal Princess Consort Yeoheung; Yeoheung Budaebuin) and his mother, Princess Consort Min, proposed a bride from their own clan, the Yeoheung Min. She was orphaned and was said to possess beautiful features, a healthy body, and an ordinary level of education.

The bride underwent a strict selection process, culminating in a meeting with the Daewongun on 6 March, and a marriage ceremony on 20 March 1866. He did not realize the empress's politically ambitious nature in the meeting he held. Ja-yeong also held a gentleness to her. It might have been because he was afraid that the Andong Kim clan and Pyungyang Jo clan would raise again in power that he chose Ja-yeong, since she had no father or brother by blood, throughout the duration of the meeting which left the Daewongun satisfied. But it was said that after meeting with Ja-yeong, he felt slightly disturbed by her presence. Saying that she "...was a woman of great determination and poise“ but paid no mind to it and allowed her to marry his son.

Min, barely 16, married the 15-year-old king and was invested in a ceremony as the Queen Consort of Joseon. Two places assert claims on the marriage and ascension: both Injeong Hall at Changdeok Palace and Norak Hall at Unhyeon Palace. The wig typically worn by brides at royal weddings was so heavy for the slight 16-year-old bride that a tall court lady was specially assigned to support it from the back. Directly following the wedding was the three-day ceremony for the reverencing of the ancestors.

The first impression of Ja-yeong at the palace was that she was in fact gentle and docile, and tried to be a good daughter-in-law but as she got older, the queen became resigned due to the Heungseon Daewongun. By the time the queen entered the palace, the 15-year-old Gojong had already favored concubine Yi Gwi-in of the Gyeongju Yi clan (Gwi-in being the first junior rank of concubine). On the day of their marriage ceremony, Gojong did not go to Queen Min's quarters but to concubine Yi Gwi-in's quarters. This would later get the favor of the Heungseon Daewongun.

Older officials soon noticed that the new queen consort was an assertive and ambitious woman, unlike other queens preceding her. She did not participate in lavish parties, rarely commissioned extravagant fashions from the royal ateliers, and almost never hosted afternoon tea parties with the various princesses of the royal family or powerful aristocratic ladies unless politics required her to do so. While she was expected to act as an icon for Korea's high society, the queen rejected this role. Instead, she devoted time to reading books generally reserved for men (such as Spring and Autumn Annals and its accompanying Zuo Zhuan,) and furthered her own education in history, science, politics, philosophy, and religion.

As queen consort

Court domination
By the age of twenty, the queen consort had begun to leave her apartments at Changgyeong Palace and to play an active part in politics in spite of the Daewongun and various high officials, who viewed her involvement as meddlesome. The political struggle between the queen consort and the Heungseon Daewongun became public when her infant son died four days after birth. The Heungseon Daewongun publicly accused her of being unable to bear a healthy male child, while she suspected her father-in-law of foul play through the ginseng emetic treatment he had brought her. It was probably likely from then on that the Empress started to hold a strong hatred for her father-in-law. The Daewongun then directed Gojong to conceive through concubine Yi Gwi-in from the Yeongbo Hall, and on 16 April 1868, she gave birth to Prince Wanhwa, to whom the Daewongun gave the title of crown prince. It was said that the Heungseon Daewongun was so overwhelmed with joy with Gojong's first born son that the Empress was not acknowledged as much.

However, the queen consort had begun to secretly form a powerful faction against the Heungseon Daewongun, once she reached adulthood; now, with the backing of high officials, scholars, and members of her clan, she sought to remove the Heungseon Daewongun from power. Min Seung-ho, the queen consort's adoptive older brother, along with court scholar Choe Ik-hyeon, devised a formal impeachment of the Heungseon Daewongun to be presented to the Royal Council of Administration, arguing that Gojong, now 22, should rule in his own right. In 1873, with the approval of Gojong and the Royal Council, the Heungseon Daewongun was forced to retire to Unhyeongung, his estate at Yangju. The queen consort then banished the royal concubine along with her child to a village outside the capital, stripped of royal titles. The child died on 12 January 1880.

With these expulsions, the queen consort gained complete control over her court, and placed family members in high court positions. Finally, she was a queen consort who ruled along with her husband; moreover she was recognized as being distinctly more politically active than Gojong.

Start of imperial Japanese influence
After Korean refusal to receive Japanese envoys announcing the Meiji Restoration, some Japanese aristocrats favored an immediate invasion of Korea, but the idea was quickly dropped upon the return of the Iwakura Mission on the grounds that the new Japanese government was neither politically nor fiscally stable enough to start a war. When Heungseon Daewongun was ousted from politics, Japan renewed efforts to establish ties with Korea, but the Imperial envoy arriving at Dongnae in 1873 was turned away.

The Japanese government, which sought to emulate the empires of Europe in their tradition of enforcing so-called Unequal Treaties, responded by sending the Japanese gunboat Unyō towards Busan and another warship to the Bay of Yeongheung on the pretext of surveying sea routes, meaning to pressure Korea into opening its doors. The  ventured into restricted waters off Ganghwa Island, provoking an attack from Korean shore batteries. The  fled but the Japanese used the incident as a pretext to force a treaty on the Korean government. In 1876 six naval vessels and an imperial Japanese envoy were sent to Ganghwa Island to enforce this command.

A majority of the royal court favored absolute isolationism, but Japan had demonstrated its willingness to use force. After numerous meetings, officials were sent to sign the Ganghwa Treaty, a treaty that had been modeled after treaties imposed on Japan by the United States. The treaty was signed on 15 February 1876, thus opening Korea to Japan and the world.

Various ports were forced to open to Japanese trade, and Japanese now had rights to buy land in designated areas. The treaty also permitted the opening of the major ports, Incheon and Wonsan to Japanese merchants. For the first few years, Japan enjoyed a near total monopoly of trade, while Korean merchants suffered serious losses.

Social revolution
In 1877, a mission headed by Kim Gi-su was commissioned by Gojong and Min clan to study Japanese westernization and its intentions for Korea.

In 1881 another mission, this one under Kim Hongjip went to Japan. Kim and his team were shocked at how large the Japanese cities had become. He noted that only 50 years before, Seoul and Busan of Korea were metropolitan centers of East Asia, dominant over underdeveloped Japanese cities; but now, in 1877, with Tokyo and Osaka westernized throughout the Meiji Restoration, Seoul and Busan looked like vestiges of the ancient past.

When they were in Japan, Kim met with the Chinese ambassador to Tokyo, Ho Ju-chang and the councilor Huang Tsun-hsien. They discussed the international situation of Qing China and Joseon's place in the rapidly changing world. Huang Tsu-hsien presented to Kim a book he had written called Korean Strategy.

China was no longer the hegemonic power of East Asia, and Korea no longer enjoyed military superiority over Japan. In addition, the Russian Empire began expansion into Asia. Huang advised that Korea should adopt a pro-Chinese policy, while retaining close ties with Japan for the time being. He also advised an alliance with the United States for protection against Russia. He advised opening trade relations with Western nations and adopting Western technology. He noted that China had tried but failed due to its size, but Korea was smaller than Japan. He viewed Korea as a barrier to Japanese expansion into mainland Asia. He suggested Korean youths be sent to China and Japan to study, and Western teachers of technical and scientific subjects be invited to Korea.

When Kim returned to Seoul, Queen Min took special interest in Huang's book and commissioned copies be sent out to all the ministers. She had hoped to win yangban (aristocratic) approval to invite Western nations into Korea, to open up trade with and keep Japan in check. She wanted to first allow Japan to help in the modernization process but towards completion of certain projects, have them be driven out by Western powers.

However, the yangban aristocracy still opposed opening the country to the West. Choi Ik-hyun, who had helped with the impeachment of Heungseon Daewongun, sided with the isolationists, saying that the Japanese were just like the "Western barbarians" who would spread subversive notions like Catholicism (which had been a major issue during Heungseon Daewongun's reign and had been quashed by massive persecutions).

To the socially conservative yangban, Queen Min's plan meant the destruction of social order. The response to the distribution of "Korean Strategy" was a joint memorandum to the throne from scholars in every province of the kingdom. They stated that the ideas in the book were mere abstract theories, unrealizable in practice, and that the adoption of Western technology was not the only way to enrich the country. They demanded that the number of envoys exchanged, ships engaged in trade and articles of trade be strictly limited, and that all foreign books in Korea should be destroyed.

Despite these objections, in 1881, a large fact-finding mission was sent to Japan to stay for seventy days observing Japanese government offices, factories, military and police organizations, and business practices. They also obtained information about innovations in the Japanese government copied from the West, especially the proposed constitution.

On the basis of these reports, the Queen Consort began the reorganization of the government. Twelve new bureaus were established that dealt with foreign relations with the West, China, and Japan. Other bureaus were established to effectively deal with commerce. A bureau of the military was created to modernize weapons and techniques. Civilian departments were also established to import Western technology.

In the same year, the Queen Consort signed documents, arranging for top military students to be sent to Qing China. The Japanese quickly volunteered to supply military students with rifles and train a unit of the Korean army to use them. She agreed but reminded the Japanese that the students would still be sent to China for further education on Western military technologies.

The modernization of the military was met with opposition. The special treatment of the new training unit caused resentment among the other troops. In September 1881, a plot was uncovered to overthrow the Queen Consort's faction, depose the King, and place Heungseon Daewongun's illegitimate (third) son, Yi Jae-seon on the throne. The plot was frustrated by the Queen Consort but Heungseon Daewongun was kept safe from persecution because he was still the father of the King.

The insurrection of 1882

In June 1882, members of the old military became resentful of the special treatment of the new units and so they destroyed the house of Min Gyeom-ho and killed him, her mother-in-law's younger brother, who was the administrative head of the training units; Yi Choi-eung and Gim Bo-hyun were also killed. These soldiers then fled to the protection of the Heungseon Daewongun, who publicly rebuked but privately encouraged them. The Heungseon Daewongun then took control of the old units.

He ordered an attack on the administrative district of Seoul that housed the Gyeongbokgung, the diplomatic quarter, military centers, and science institutions. The soldiers attacked police stations to free comrades who had been arrested and then began ransacking private estates and mansions belonging to relatives of the Queen Consort. These units then stole rifles and began to kill Japanese training officers, and narrowly missed killing the Japanese ambassador to Seoul, who quickly escaped to Incheon. The military rebellion then headed towards the palace but both Queen Consort and the King escaped in disguise and fled to her relative's villa in Cheongju, where they remained in hiding.

It was also said that when Grand Internal Princess Consort Sunmok had entered the palace, she hid Empress Myseongseong, in what was probably a wooden litter she was riding on, but was seen by a court officer who then told the soldiers that were invading the palace. Her mother-in-law then tried to persuade the Heungseon Daewongun to stop chasing after the queen which gave him suspicions. The Heungseon Daewongun became resentful towards his wife after the ordeal, and kept her away from his affairs.

When the Daewongun could not find the queen, he announced, "the queen is dead". Numerous supporters of the Queen Consort were put to death as soon as the Daewongun arrived and took administrative control of Gyeongbokgung Palace. He immediately dismantled the reform measures implemented by the Queen Consort and relieved the new units of their duties. Foreign policy quickly returned to isolationism, and Chinese and Japanese envoys were forced out of the capital.

Li Hongzhang, with the consent of Korean envoys in Beijing, sent 4,500 Chinese troops to restore order, as well as to secure Chinese interests in the country. The troops arrested the Heungseon Daewongun, who was then taken to China to be tried for treason. The royal couple returned and overturned all of the Daewongun's actions.

The Japanese forced King Gojong privately, without Queen Min's knowledge, to sign the Japan-Korea Treaty of 1882 on 10 August 1882, to pay 550,000 yen for lives and property that the Japanese had lost during the insurrection, and permit Japanese troops to guard the Japanese embassy in Seoul. When the Queen Consort learned of the treaty, she proposed to China a new trade agreement, granting the Chinese special privileges and rights to ports inaccessible to the Japanese. She also requested that a Chinese commander take control of the new military units and a German adviser named Paul Georg von Möllendorff to head the Maritime Customs Service.

Mission to North America
In September 1883, the Queen Consort established English language schools with U.S. instructors. She sent a special mission in July 1883 to the United States, headed by Min Yeong-ik, her adoptive nephew. The mission arrived at San Francisco carrying the newly created Korean national flag, visited many U.S. historical sites, heard lectures on U.S. history, and attended a gala event in their honor given by the mayor of San Francisco and other U.S. officials. The mission dined with President Chester A. Arthur, and discussed the growing threat of Japanese and U.S. investment in Korea. At the end of September, Min Yeong-ik returned to Seoul and reported to the Queen Consort:

The reformist vs. the conservatives
The Progressives were founded during the late 1870s by a group of yangban who fully supported Westernization of Joseon. However, they wanted immediate Westernization, including a complete cut-off of ties with Qing China. Unaware of their anti-Chinese sentiments, the Queen Consort granted frequent audiences and meetings with them to discuss progressivism and nationalism. They advocated for educational and social reforms, including the equality of the sexes by granting women full rights, issues that were not even acknowledged in their already Westernized neighbor of Japan. The Queen Consort was completely enamored by the Progressives in the beginning, but when she learned that they were deeply anti-Chinese, she quickly turned her back on them. Cutting ties with China immediately was not in her gradual plan of Westernization. She saw the consequences Joseon would have to face if she did not play China and Japan off by the West gradually, especially since she was a strong advocate of the Sadae faction who were pro-China and pro-gradual Westernization.

However, in 1884, the conflict between the Progressives and the Sadaes intensified. When American legation officials, particularly Naval Attaché George C. Foulk, heard about the growing problem, they were outraged and reported directly to the Queen Consort. The Americans attempted to bring the two groups to peace with each other to aid the Queen Consort in a peaceful transformation of Joseon into a modern nation. After all, she liked the ideas and plans of both parties. As a matter of fact, she was in support of many of the Progressive's ideas, except for severing relations with China.

Be that as it may, the Progressives, fed up with the Sadaes and the growing influence of the Chinese, sought the aid of the Japanese legation guards and staged a bloody palace coup on 4 December 1884. The Progressives killed numerous high Sadaes and secured key government positions vacated by the Sadaes who had fled the capital or had been killed.

The refreshed administration began to issue various edicts in both the King and Queen Consort's names and they were eager to implement political, economic, social, and cultural reforms. However, the Empress was horrified by the bellicosity of the Progressives and refused to support their actions and declared any documents signed in her name to be null and void. After only two days of new influence over the administration, they were crushed by Chinese troops under Yuan Shih-kai's command. A handful of Progressive leaders were killed. Once again, the Japanese government saw the opportunity to extort money out of the Joseon government by forcing Gojong, again without the knowledge of his wife, to sign a treaty. The Treaty of Hanseong forced Joseon to pay a large sum of indemnity for damages inflicted on Japanese lives and property during the coup.

On 18 April 1885 the Li-Ito Agreement was made in Tianjin, China, between the Japanese and the Chinese. In it, they both agreed to pull troops out of Joseon and that either party would send troops only if their property was endangered and that each would inform the other before doing so. Both nations also agreed to pull out their military instructors to allow the newly arrived Americans to take full control of that duty. The Japanese withdrew troops from Korea, leaving a small number of legation guards, but the Queen Consort was ahead of the Japanese in their game. She summoned Chinese envoys and through persuasion, convinced them to keep 2,000 soldiers disguised as Joseon police or merchants to guard the borders from any suspicious Japanese actions and to continue to train Korean troops.

Public policy

Education
Peace finally settled upon the once-renowned "Land of the Morning Calm." With the majority of Japanese troops out of Joseon and Chinese protection readily available, the plans for further, drastic modernization were continued. Plans to establish a palace school to educate children of the elite had been in the making since 1880 but were finally executed in May 1885 with the approval of the Queen Consort. A palace school named "Yugyoung Kung-won" was established, with an American missionary, Homer B. Hulbert, and three other missionaries to lead the development of the curriculum. The school had two departments, liberal education and military education. Courses were taught exclusively in English using English textbooks. However, due to low attendance, the school was closed shortly after the last English teacher, Bunker, resigned in late 1893.

The Queen Consort also gave her patronage to the first all-girls' educational institution, Ewha Academy, established in Seoul, 1886 by American missionary, Mary F. Scranton (later became the Ewha University). In reality, as Louisa Rothweiler, a founding teacher of Ewha Academy observed, the school was, at its early stage, more of a place for poor girls to be fed and clothed than a place of education. The creation of the academy was a significant social change. The institution survives to this day as the Ewha Woman's University – one of the Republic of Korea's top private universities and still an all-women's school.

The Protestant missionaries contributed much to the development of Western education in Joseon Korea. The Queen Consort, unlike her father-in-law, who had oppressed Christians, invited different missionaries to enter Joseon. She valued their knowledge of Western history, science, and mathematics, and was aware of the advantage of having them within the nation. Unlike the Isolationists, she saw no threat to the Confucian morals of Korean society in the advent of Christianity. Religious tolerance was another one of her goals.

The press
It included contemporary news of the day, essays and articles about Westernization, and news of further modernization of Joseon.

In January 1886, the  published a new newspaper named the Hanseong Jubo (The Seoul Weekly). The publication of a Korean-language newspaper was a significant development, and the paper itself played an important role as a communication media to the masses until it was abolished in 1888 under pressure from the Chinese government.

A newspaper entirely in Hangul, making no use of the Korean Hanja script, was not published again until 1894.  (The Seoul News) was published as a weekly newspaper under the patronage of both Gojong and the Queen Consort; it was written half in Korean and half in Japanese.

Medicine, religion, and music
The arrival of Horace Newton Allen under invitation of the Queen Consort in September 1884 marked the formal introduction of Christianity, which spread rapidly in Joseon. He was able, with the Queen Consort's permission and official sanction, to arrange for the appointment of other missionaries as government employees. He also introduced modern medicine in Korea by establishing the first western Royal Medical Clinic of Gwanghyewon in February 1885.

In April 1885, a horde of Protestant missionaries began to flood into Joseon. The Isolationists were horrified, realizing their defeat by the Queen Consort. The doors to Korea were not only open to ideas, technology, and culture but also to other religions. Having lost immense power with Heungseon Daewongun, who was still captive in China, the Isolationists could do nothing but simply watch. Prominent Protestant missionaries, such as Horace Grant Underwood, Lillias Underwood (née Horton), William B. Scranton and his mother, Mary Scranton, made Korea their new home in May 1885. They established churches within Seoul and began to establish centers in the countrysides. Catholic missionaries arrived soon afterwards, reviving Catholicism, which had witnessed massive persecution in 1866 under Heungseon Daewongun's rule.

While winning many converts, Christian missionaries made significant contributions towards the modernization of the country. Concepts of equality, human rights and freedom, and the participation of both men and women in religious activities were all new to Joseon. The Queen Consort was ecstatic at the prospect of integrating these values within the government. She had wanted the literacy rate to rise, and with the aid of Christian educational programs, it did so significantly within a matter of a few years.

Drastic changes were made to music as well. Western music theory partly displaced the traditional Eastern concepts. The Protestant missions introduced Christian hymns and other Western songs that created a strong impetus to modernize Korean ideas about music. The organ and other Western musical instruments were introduced in 1890, and a Christian hymnal was published in the Korean language in 1893 under the commission of the Queen Consort. She herself, however, never became a Christian, but remained a devout Buddhist with influences from shamanism and Confucianism; her religious beliefs would become the model, indirectly, for those of many modern Koreans, who share her belief in pluralism and religious tolerance.

Military
Modern weapons were imported from Japan and the United States in 1883. The first military factories were established and new military uniforms were created in 1884. Under joint patronage of Gojong and his Queen Consort, a request was made to the United States for more American military instructors to speed up the military modernization of Korea. Out of all the projects that were going on simultaneously, the military project took the longest.

In October 1883, American minister Lucius Foote arrived to take command of the modernization of Joseon's older army units that had not started Westernizing. In April 1888, General William McEntyre Dye and two other military instructors arrived from the United States, followed in May by a fourth instructor. They brought about rapid military development.

A new military school was created called , and an officers training program began. However, despite armies becoming more and more on par with the Chinese and the Japanese, the idea of a navy was neglected. As a result, it became one of the few failures of the modernization project. Due to the neglect of developing naval defence, Joseon's long sea borders were open to invasion. It was an ironic mistake since nearly 300 years earlier, Joseon's navy was the strongest in all of East Asia. Now, the Korean navy was nothing but ancient ships that could barely defend themselves from the advanced ships of modern navies.

However, for a short while, hope for the Korean military could be seen. With rapidly growing armies, Japan itself was becoming fearful of the impact of Korean troops if her government did not interfere soon to stall the process.

Economy
Following the opening of all Korean ports to the Japanese and Western merchants in 1888, contact and involvement with outsiders increased foreign trade rapidly. In 1883, the Maritime Customs Service was established under the patronage of the Queen Consort and the supervision of Sir Robert Hart, 1st Baronet of the United Kingdom. The Maritime Customs Service administered the business of foreign trade and collection of tariffs.

By 1883, the economy was now no longer in a state of monopoly conducted by Japanese merchants as it had been only a few years ago. The majority was in control by the Koreans while portions were distributed between Western nations, Japan and China. In 1884, the first Korean commercial firms such as the Daedong and the Changdong Company emerged. The Bureau of Mint also produced a new coin called  in 1884, securing a stable Korean currency at the time. Western investment began to take hold as well in 1886.

The German A.H. Maeterns, with the aid of the United States Department of Agriculture, created a new project called "American Farm" on a large plot of land donated by the Queen Consort to promote modern agriculture. Farm implements, seeds, and milk cows were imported from the United States. In June 1883, the Bureau of Machines was established and steam engines were imported. However, despite the fact that Gojong and his Queen Consort brought the Korean economy to an acceptable level to the West, modern manufacturing facilities did not emerge due to a political interruption: the assassination of the Queen Consort. Be that as it may, telegraph lines between Joseon, China, and Japan were laid between 1883 and 1885, facilitating communication.

Personal life

Early years
Detailed descriptions of Min can be found in both The National Assembly Library of Korea and records kept by Lillias Underwood (1851–1921), a close and trusted American friend of Min who came to Korea in 1888 as a missionary and was appointed as her doctor.

Both sources describe the Empress' appearance, voice, and public manner. She was said to have had a soft face with strong features—a classic beauty contrasting with the king's preference for "sultry" women. Her personal speaking voice was soft and warm, but when conducting affairs of the state, she asserted her points with strength. Her public manner was formal, and she heavily adhered to court etiquette and traditional law. Underwood described the Empress in the following:

Isabella Bird Bishop, a British woman who was a member of the Royal Geographical Society, had described the Empress' appearance to be that of "...a very nice-looking slender woman, with glossy raven-black hair and a very pale skin, the pallor enhanced by the use of pearl powder" while meeting with her when Bishop traveled to Korea. Bishop had also mentioned Empress Myeongseong in her book, Korea and Her Neighbours, in detail:

Bishop described Jayeong as "clever and educated", and Gojong to be "kind" during the time she visited the palace.

William Franklin Sands, a United States diplomat who came to Korea during Japan's colonization, also spoke highly about Empress Myeongseong:

The young queen consort and her husband were incompatible in the beginning of their marriage. Both found the other's ways repulsive; she preferred to stay in her chambers studying, while he enjoyed spending his days and nights drinking and attending banquets and royal parties. The queen, who was genuinely concerned with the affairs of the state and immersed herself in philosophy, history, and science books normally reserved for  men, once remarked to a close friend, "He disgusts me."

Court officials noted that the queen consort was exclusive in choosing who she associated with and confided in. She chose to not consummate her marriage on her wedding night as court tradition dictated her to, but later had immense difficulty in conceiving a healthy heir. Her first pregnancy came five years after marriage, at the age of 21, and ended in despair and humiliation when her infant son died shortly after birth. This was followed with losing her first infant daughter at the age of 23, her third infant son at the age of 25, and her fourth infant son at the age of 28; leaving her with Yi Cheok, her only living child, born when she was 24. The queen's failed pregnancies were probably because of the constant conflicts she and her husband faced with the Heungseon Daewongun and other countries during the modernization of the Joseon Dynasty.

When the royal couple married in 1866, there was already a skirmish with France occurring and during 1876, the process of the Treaty of Ganghwa had made the relationship of the Heungseon Daewongun and Gojong unbearable. As their relationship deteriorated, this led to the king's father making death threats against her, and it was most noticeable during the Insurrection of 1882, in the 1884 coup where her relatives were killed, and in 1874 when her mother died. As a result, she stopped having children as she was always exposed to danger; which was considered a bit early since royal women stopped giving birth around their early thirties.

Her second son, Sunjong, was never a healthy child, often catching illnesses and convalescing in bed for weeks. This led to the Empress to care for the Crown Prince and being anxious that a son of a concubine would replace her son, and prompted her to go after the help of shamans and giving monks beneficial positions to ask for their blessing. The Crown Prince and the Empress shared a close mother and son relationship despite her domineering personality. While Min was unable to truly connect with Gojong in the early years, trials during their later marriage brought them together.

Later years

Both the Gojong and his Queen began to grow affections for each other during their later years. Gojong was pressured by his advisers to grab control of the government and administer his nation. However, Gojong was not chosen to become King because of his acumen (which he lacked because he was never formally educated) or because of his bloodline (which was mixed with courtesan and common blood), but because the Pungyang Jo clan had falsely assumed they could control the boy through his father. When it was actually time for Gojong to assume his responsibilities of the state, he often needed the aid of his wife to conduct international and domestic affairs. In this, Gojong grew an admiration for his wife's wit, intelligence, and ability to learn quickly. As the problems of the kingdom grew bigger and bigger, Gojong relied even more on his wife, she becoming his rock during times of frustration.

During the years of modernization of Joseon, it is safe to assume that Gojong was finally in love with his wife. They began to spend much time with each other, privately and officially. They shared each other's problems, celebrated each other's joys, and felt each other's pains. They finally became husband and wife.

His affection for her was undying, and it has been noted that after the death of his Queen Consort, Gojong locked himself up in his chambers for several weeks, refusing to assume his duties.

When he finally came out of his chambers, he lost the will to even try and signed treaty after treaty that was proposed by the Japanese, giving the Japanese immense power. When his father regained political power after the death of his daughter-in-law, he presented a proposal with the aid of certain Japanese officials to lower his daughter-in-law's status as Queen Consort all the way to commoner posthumously. Gojong, a man who had always been used by others and never used his own voice for his own causes, was noted by scholars as having said, "I would rather slit my wrists and let them bleed than disgrace the woman who saved this kingdom." In an act of defiance, he refused to sign his father's and the Japanese proposal, and turned them away.

It has been stated that after Gojong's father died in 1898; he did not attend his funeral due to their strained relationship.

Assassination

The Empress' assassination, known in Korea as the Eulmi Incident, occurred in the early hours of 8 October 1895 at Okhoru in Geoncheonggung, which was the rear private royal residence (the king's quarters) inside Gyeongbokgung Palace.

In the early hours of 8 October, the assassination was carried out by Heungseon Daewongun's guide, which was in conflict with Empress Myeongseong. Japanese agents under Miura Goro carried out the assassination. Miura had orchestrated this incident with Okamoto Ryūnosuke (岡本柳之助), Sugimura Fukashi (杉村 濬), Kunitomo Shigeaki (國友重章), Sase Kumatetsu (佐瀨熊鐵), Nakamura Tateo (中村楯雄), Hirayama Iwahiko (平山岩彦), and over fifty other Japanese men. Said to have collaborated in this were the pro-Japanese officers Major  and Major Yi Du-hwang both battalion commanders in the Hullyeondae, a Japanese-trained regiment of the Royal Guards. The 1,000 Korean soldiers of the Hullyeondae, led by Majors Woo and Yi had surrounded and opened the gates of the palace, allowing a group of Japanese ronin to enter the inner sanctum.

Upon hearing the cry of Lieutenant Colonel Hong Gye-hun, the Queen changed into court lady attire to disguise herself among the rest of the court ladies and hid before the Japanese arrived at Okhoru. It is said that the empress had asked the Crown Prince if he was safe before she was killed.

As the Japanese soldiers were coming in, Gojong tried to divert their attention away from the Queen, to have her escape the palace, by putting himself in front of their search but this led them to beat the court ladies and threaten the Crown Prince at sword point to make him talk on the whereabouts of his mother. But her son did not disclose her location and made it safely to where his father stood to which he watched the queen run as a Japanese soldier followed her down a path with a sword. The wife of the Crown Prince, Crown Princess Consort Min (later Empress Sunmyeong), was dragged downstairs while she was with a few court ladies, had her hair cut, and was beaten by the soldiers.

In front of Gwanghwamun, the Hullyeondae soldiers led by Woo, and the Japanese Legation Security Group led by Lieutenant Commander Niiro Tokisuke climbed over the palace walls and battled the royal guard unit, the Capital Guards (Siwidae) led by their commanders Lieutenant Colonel Hong Gye-hun, An Gyeong-su, Major Hyeon Heung-taek, and General William McEntyre Dye incidentally. But due to inferior weaponry (most modern weapons were captured during the occupation of Geyonbokgung Palace) and numbers, Hong and Minister Yi Gyeong-jik were subsequently killed in firefight, causing the palace defenses to collapse, and forced William and Hyeon and the remaining guards to retreat allowing the ronin to proceed to Okhoru, within Geoncheonggung, and kill the Empress brutally. It was said that Yi Gyeong-ik outstretched his arms in attempt to protect the queen but it only gave away the clue as to who she was, leading to his death and queen's. It is said that Empress Sunmyeong, the empress' daughter-in-law, was a witness to her assassination as she stood in front attempting to protect her. She later died due to her depression.

The corpse of the Empress, and the two court ladies that followed her ill-fate, was moved to the Daeguk Pine Tree Forest where her body was violated and then drenched in oil to be burned and buried. As news reached that Japan was involved in the assassination, an investigation was conducted in October; only a single finger bone was found within the ash and sand so it made identifying body parts hard when a eunuch reported, and gave them back to Emperor Gojong. The title of the queen was also given back.

Historian of Japan Peter Duus has called this assassination a "hideous event, crudely conceived and brutally executed." Donald Keene, who calls the queen "an arrogant and corrupt woman", says that the way in which she was murdered was nonetheless "unspeakably barbaric."

Gojong's The Veritable Records of the Joseon Dynasty do not have a Japanese name. The names written are: Jeong Zun (2nd Battalion Officer), Yi Doo (1st Battalion Officer), Yi Chung (Senior 2nd Battalion), Yi Chun (Deputy Commander), Gong Yu Zhen (at that time police officer).

An eyewitness account

Crown Prince Sunjong reported that he saw Korean troops led by Woo Beom-seon at the site of the assassination, and accused Woo as the "Foe of Mother". In addition to his accusation, Sunjong sent two assassins to kill Woo, an effort that succeeded in Hiroshima, Japan, in 1903. By then, Woo had married a Japanese woman, and had sired Woo Jang-choon (禹長春 우장춘), later to become an acclaimed botanist and agricultural scientist.

Lieutenant Colonel Yi Hak-gyun wrote that some of the assassins wore military uniform while others were in their civilian clothes. Also he reported that the Capital Guards were not able to stop the assassins from coming.

In 2005, professor Kim Rekho of the Russian Academy of Sciences came across a written account of the incident by a Russian architect Afanasy Seredin-Sabatin in the Archive of Foreign Policy of the Russian Empire (AVPRI). Seredin-Sabatin was in the service of the Korean government, working with the American general William McEntyre Dye who was also under contract to the Korean government. In April, Kim made a request to the Myongji University Library LG Collection to make the document public. On 11 May 2005 the document was made public.

Almost five years before the document's release in South Korea, a translated copy was in circulation in the United States, having been released by the Center for Korean Research of Columbia University on 6 October 1995 to commemorate the 100th anniversary of the Eulmi Incident.

In the account, Seredin-Sabatin recorded:

Involved groups

 Japanese Legation Security Group (公使館守備隊), a joint military unit (Imperial Japanese Army and Imperial Japanese Navy) who provided security for the Japanese legation. It was commanded by legation minister Miura Gorō. After the assassination, Lieutenant Commander Niiro Tokisuke (新納時亮), an IJN Officer of the Japanese Legation Security Group wrote a report on the assassination: "the King is safe and secure; the Queen has been eliminated (国王無事王妃殺害)"
 Japanese Legation Security Police Officers, commanded by legation minister Miura Gorō and led by MOFA Police Chief Inspector (外務省警部) Hagiwara Hidejiro (萩原秀次郎) at the scene. The Japanese Legation Security Police Officers wore plain clothes during the Eulmi Incident.
 Three battalions of the Hullyeondae, commanded by Major Woo Beom-seon (1st battalion), Major Yi Doo-hwang (2nd battalion), and Major Yi Jin-ho (3rd battalion). Hullyeondae commander Lieutenant Colonel Hong Gye-hun did not notice the betrayal by his officers and was killed in action by his own men.
 At least four Imperial Japanese Army Keijō garrison (京城守備隊) officers who served as military advisors and instructors of the Hullyeondae, including Second Lieutenant Miyamoto Taketaro (宮本竹太郞). The IJA Keijō Garrison was commanded by the Imperial Japanese Army General Staff Office, but Second Lieutenant Miyamoto's crew joined in the Eulmi Incident without permission from the IJA General Staff Office.
 More than four dozen ronin, including Adachi Kenzō. They took the role of a vanguard. According to a secret report by Ishizuka Eizo, most of them originally came from Kumamoto Prefecture and were armed with katanas and handguns. (On 3 December 1965, Japanese politician Kuroyanagi Akira (黒柳明) mentioned part of Ishizuka Eizo's secret report in the Special Committee on Japan-Korea Treaty (日韓条約等特別委員会), House of Councillors).

Involved parties
In Japan, 56 men were charged. All were acquitted by the Hiroshima court due to a lack of evidence.

They included
 Viscount Miura Gorō, Japanese legation minister.
 Okamoto Ryūnosuke (岡本柳之助), a legation official and former Japanese Army officer
 Hozumi Torakurō (穂積寅九郎), businessman
 Kokubun Shōtarō, Japanese legation officials 
 Chief Inspector Hagiwara Hidejiro, Officer Watanabe Takajiro (渡辺 鷹次郎), Officer Oda Toshimitsu (小田俊光), Officer Naruse Kishiro (成瀬 喜四郎), Officer Yokoo Yujiro (横尾 勇次郎), Officer Sakai Masutaro (境 益太郎), Officer Shiraishi Yoshitaro (白石 由太郎), Officer Kinowaki Yoshinori (木脇祐則), Japanese legation officials (Japanese Legation Security Police)
 Sugimura Fukashi (杉村 濬), a second Secretary of the Japanese legation, Legation minister Miura's inner circle. In his autobiography "Meiji 17~18 Year, The Record of the torment in Korea (明治廿七八年在韓苦心録)", he unilaterally claims that the Eulmi Incident was his own scheme, not Miura's.
 Adachi Kenzo, former Samurai, editor of Japanese newspaper in Korea, Kanjō Shimpō (漢城新報, also called  in Korean)
 Lieutenant Colonel Kusunose Yukihiko, an artillery officer in the Imperial Japanese Army and Military Attaché at the Japanese legation in Korea, Legation minister Miura's inner circle.
 Kunitomo Shigeaki (國友重章), one of the original Seikyōsha (Society for Political Education) members
 Shiba Shirō (柴四朗), former samurai, private secretary to the Minister of Agriculture and Commerce of Japan, and writer who studied political economy at the Wharton School and Harvard University. He had a close connection with Japanese legation minister Miura Gorō because Shiba contributed Miura becoming a resident legation minister in Korea.
 Sase Kumatetsu (佐瀨熊鐵), a physician
 Terasaki Yasukichi (寺崎泰吉), a medicine peddler
 Nakamura Tateo (中村楯雄)
 Horiguchi Kumaichi (堀口 九萬一):In 2021, a letter was found which was sent by him to his friend which writes about how the assassination went down, mentioning how easy it was.
 Ieiri Kakitsu (家入嘉吉)
 Kikuchi Kenjō (菊池 謙讓)
 Hirayama Iwahiko (平山岩彦)
 Ogihara Hidejiro (荻原秀次郎)
 Kobayakawa Hideo (小早川秀雄), editor in chief of Kanjō Shimpō
 Sasaki Masayuki
 Isujuka Eijoh
and others.

In Korea, King Gojong declared that the following were the 'Eulmi Four Traitors (을미사적, Eulmisajeok, 乙未四賊)' on 11 February 1896:
 Jo Hui-yeon (趙羲淵 조희연)
 Yoo Gil-joon (兪吉濬 유길준)
 Kim Hong-jip (金弘集 김홍집)
 Jeong Byeong-ha (鄭秉夏 정병하)

Aftermath
After the successful assassination, Emperor Meiji got the news about it and tried to cover it.

The Gabo Reform and the assassination of Empress Myeongseong generated a backlash against the Japanese presence in Korea; it caused some Confucian scholars, as well as farmers, to form over 60 successive righteous armies to fight for Korean freedom on the Korean peninsula. The assassination is also credited as a significant event in the life of Syngman Rhee, the future first president of South Korea.

The assassination of Empress Myeongseong, and the subsequent backlash, played a role in the assassination of influential statesman and Prince Itō Hirobumi. Itō Hirobumi was a four-time prime minister of Japan, former Resident-General of Korea, and then President of the Privy Council of Japan. Empress Myeongseong's assassination was the first of 15 reasons given by the Korean-independence assassin An Jung-geun, who is regarded as a hero in Korea, in defense of his actions.

After the assassination, King Gojong and the Crown Prince (later Emperor Sunjong) fled for refuge to the Russian legation on 11 February 1896. He ordered the deaths of pro-Japanese officials such as the Four Eulmi Traitors ending the Gabo Reform. Gojong disbanded the Hullyeondae for participating in the assassination and Capital Guards in August 1895 for failing to stop the Japanese. However, In 1897, Gojong, yielding to rising pressure from both overseas and the demands of the Independence Association-led public opinion, returned to Gyeongungung (modern-day Deoksugung). There, he proclaimed the founding of the Korean Empire.

On 6 January 1897, Gojong changed Queen Min's title to "Queen Moonseong,"; changing her Neungho (funeral) location to Hongneung. After some discussion with officials on the similarity to King Jeongjo's Moonseong temple name, Gojong changed the name to "Queen Myeongseong" on 2 March 1897 (not to be confused with Queen Myeongseong of the Cheongpung Kim clan, King Hyeonjong's wife). As Gojong proclaimed a new reign and became Emperor Gwangmu on 13 October 1897, the queen's title was also changed to "Empress Myeongseong"; adding  to her posthumous title in 1897.

However, Korea succumbed to Japanese colonial rule after Japan's victory in the Russo-Japanese War, and the Hirobumi mentioned above the assassination in 1909. Prime Minister Ye Wanyong signed the Japan-Korea Annexation Treaty, without the knowledge of the Emperor, that would last from 29 August 1910 to 15 August 1945.

Funeral procession and tomb
On 13 October 1897, King Gojong, with Russian support, had regained his throne, and spent "a fortune" to have his beloved Queen Min's remains properly honored and entombed. On 22 November 1897, her mourning procession included 5,000 soldiers, 650 police, 4,000 lanterns, hundreds of scrolls honoring her, and giant wooden horses intended for her use in the afterlife. The honors King Gojong placed on Queen Min for her funeral was meant as a statement to her diplomatic and heroic endeavors for Korea against the Japanese, as well as a statement of his own undying love for her. Queen Min's recovered remains are in her tomb located in Namyangju, Gyeonggi, South Korea..

Current events
In May 2005, 84-year-old Tatsumi Kawano (川野 龍巳), the grandson of Kunitomo Shigeaki, paid his respects to Empress Myeongseong at her tomb in Namyangju, Gyeonggi, South Korea. He apologized to Empress Myeongseong's tomb on behalf of his grandfather, however, the apology was not well received as the descendants of Empress Myeongseong pointed out that the apology had to be made on a governmental level.

Since 2009, Korean organizations have been trying to sue the Japanese government for their documented complicity in the murder of Queen Min. "Japan has not made an official apology or repentance 100 years after it obliterated the Korean people for 35 years through the 1910 Korea-Japan Annexation Treaty," the statement said. The lawsuit will be filed if the Japanese government does not accept their demands that the Japanese government issue a special statement on 15 August offering the emperor's apology and mentioning whether it will release related documents on the murder case.

Family
 Great-Great-Great-Great-Great-Great-Great-Great-Grandfather
 Min Hyo-son
 Great-Great-Great-Great-Great-Great-Great-Great-Grandmother
 Lady Yun of the Papyeong Yun clan; daughter of Yun Ji-kang
 Great-Great-Great-Great-Great-Great-Great-Grandfather
 Min Yeo-jun (민여준, 閔汝俊) (1539–1599)
 Great-Great-Great-Great-Great-Great-Great-Grandmother
 Lady Yi of the Jeonju Yi clan (전주 이씨, 全州 李氏); descendant of Grand Prince Hyoryeong
 Great-Great-Great-Great-Great-Great-Grandfather
 Min Gi (1568–18 January 1641)
 Great-Great-Great-Great-Great-Great-Grandmother
 Lady Hong of the Namyang Hong clan(남양 홍씨, 南陽 洪氏); daughter of Hong Ik-hyeon (홍익현, 洪翼賢)
 Great-Great-Great-Great-Great-Grandfather
 Min Gwang-hun (Hangul: 민광훈) (1595–1659), scholar during the reign of King Injong.
 Great-Great-Great-Great-Great-Grandmother
 Lady Yi of the Yeonan Yi clan; daughter of Yi Gwang-jeong and Lady Heo of the Yangcheon Heo clan
 Great-Great-Great-Great-Grandfather
 Min Yu-jung (1630–1687)
 Great-Great-Great-Great-Grandmother
 Internal Princess Consort Eunseong of the Eunjin Song clan (1637–1672); Min Yu-jung's second wife; daughter of Song Jun-gil, Yeonguijeong during the reign of King Hyojong.
 Great-Great-Great-Grandfather
 Min Jin-hu (1659–1720), eldest brother of Queen Inhyeon (second consort of King Sukjong).
 Great-Great-Great-Grandmother
 Lady Yi of the Yeonan Yi clan; daughter of Yi Deok-ro, Min Jin-hu's second wife
 Great-Great-Grandfather
 Min Ik-su (1690–1742).
 Great-Grandfather
 Min Baek-bun (1723–?)
 Great-Grandmother 
 Lady Sim; daughter of Sim Jung-hyeon
 Grandfather
 Min Gi-hyeon (1751–1 August 1811); was appointed to Kaeseong Ministry
 Grandmother
 Lady Jeong of the Yeonil Jeong clan (1773–9 March 1838); Min Gi-hyeon's third wife
 Father
 Min Chi-rok, Internal Prince Yeoseong (1799 – 17 September 1858)
 Mother
 Internal Princess Consort Hanchang of the Hansan Yi clan (1818 – 30 November 1874); Min Chi-rok's second wife,
 Grandfather: Yi Gyu-nyeon (이규년, 李圭年)
 Grandmother: Lady Kim of the Andong Kim clan (안동 김씨, 安東 金氏)
 Stepmother: Internal Princess Consort Haeryeong of the Haeju Oh clan (해령부부인 해주 오씨, 海寧府夫人 海州 吳氏) (1798 – 15 March 1833)
 Step-Grandfather: Oh Hui-sang (오희상, 吳煕常) (1763–1833)
 Siblings
 Adoptive older brother: Min Seung-ho (1830–30 November 1874); son of Min Chi-gu (1795–1874)
 Adoptive sister-in-law: Lady Kim of the Gwangsan Kim clan (?–? 23 April); Min Seung-ho's first wife 
 Unnamed adoptive nephew (?–1874)
 Adoptive nephew: Min Yeong-ik (1860–1914); eldest son of Min Tae-ho (1834–1884)
 Adoptive sister-in-law: Lady Kim of the Yeonan Kim clan (?–? 11 February); Min Seung-ho's second wife
 Adoptive sister-in-law: Lady Yi of the Deoksu Yi clan (?–? 1 July); Min Seung-ho's third wife
 Unnamed older brother; premature death 
 Older sister: Lady Min of the Yeoheung Min clan; premature death
 Older sister: Lady Min of the Yeoheung Min clan; premature death
 Husband
King Gojong (later Emperor Gojong) (9 September 1852 – 21 January 1919)
 Father-in-law: Heungseon Daewongun (21 December 1820 – 22 February 1898)
 Legal father-in-law: King Munjo of Joseon (18 September 1809 – 25 June 1830)
 Mother-in-law: Grand Internal Princess Consort Sunmok of the Yeoheung Min clan (3 February 1818 – 8 January 1898)
 Legal mother-in-law: Queen Shinjeong of the Pungyang Jo clan (21 January 1809 – 4 June 1890)
 Children
 Unnamed son (4 November 1871 – 8 November 1871)
 Unnamed daughter (13 February 1873 – 28 September 1873)
 Son: Emperor Sunjong (25 March 1874 – 24 April 1926)
 Daughter-in-law: Empress Sunmyeong of the Yeoheung Min clan (20 November 1872 – 5 November 1904) – daughter of Min Tae-ho, leader of the Yeoheung Min clan
 Daughter-in-law: Empress Sunjeong of the Haepyeong Yun clan (19 September 1894 – 3 February 1966) – daughter of Marquis Yun Taek-yeong
 Unnamed son (5 April 1875 – 18 April 1875)
 Unnamed son (18 February 1878 – 5 June 1878)

Photographs and illustrations

Documents note that she was in an official royal family photograph. A royal family photograph does exist, but it was taken after her death; consisting of Gojong, Sunjong, and Crown Princess Min, Sunjong's first wife. Shin Byong-ryong, a professor at Konkuk University, said that the reason why there are not many photos of Empress Myeongseong was because she lived in constant fear of being known to the public. Others believe that there is in fact a photo of her since she was politically active, and suspects that Japan had removed any traces of the Empress after her assassination, or has kept a photo of her.

Another photograph surfaces

There was a report by KBS News in 2003 that a photograph allegedly of the Empress had been disclosed to the public. The photograph was supposedly purchased for a large sum by the grandfather of Min Su-gyeong that was to be passed down as a family treasure. In the photo, the woman is accompanied by a retinue at her rear. Some experts have stated that the woman was clearly of high-rank, and possibly a wife of a bureaucrat. The woman's clothing appears to be that is worn only by the royal family however, her outfit lacked the embroideries that decorates the apparel of the empress and so some dismissed that the woman is the Empress' servant.

Alleged portraits of Empress Myeongseong 
There was an original European oil painting done by an Italian artist named Giuseppe Castiglione (1688–1766) that was allegedly the portrait of the Empress. But it was soon found out that the painting was a portrait of Xiang Fei; a concubine of Emperor Qianlong during 18th century Qing Dynasty.

In August 2017, an antique gallery exhibition, held by Daboseong Ancient Art Museum in Central Seoul, had a portrait of a woman that was assumed to be Empress Myeongseong. The woman is seen wearing a white hanbok, a white hemp hat, and leather shoes sitting on a western-style chair. Kim Jong-chun, director of Daboseong Gallery, has said that upon inspection of the portrait, Min clan was written on the top and portrait of a Madame on the back. But due to infraring the portrait, it was damaged. Scholars and an art professor say that it is not the Empress.

Japanese illustration

On 13 January 2005, history professor Lee Tae-jin (이태진, 李泰鎭) of Seoul National University unveiled an illustration from an old Japanese magazine he had found at an antique bookstore in Tokyo. The 84th edition of the Japanese magazine Fūzokugahō (風俗畫報) published on 25 January 1895 has a Japanese illustration of Gojong and the then-Queen Consort receiving Inoue Kaoru, the Japanese chargé d'affaires. The illustration is marked 24 December 1894 and signed by the artist Ishizuka (石塚) with a legend "The [Korean] King and Queen, moved by our honest advice, realize the need for resolute reform for the first time." Lee said that the depiction of the clothes and background are very detailed and suggests that it was drawn at the scene as it happened. Both the King and Inoue were looking at the then-Queen Consort as though the conversation were taking place between the Queen and Inoue with the King listening.

In popular culture

Film and television
 Portrayed by Hwang Jeong-sun in the 1959 film Daewongun and Minbi
 Portrayed by Choi Eun-hee in the 1964 film The Sino-Japanese War and Queen Min the Heroine
 Portrayed by Do Geum-bong in the 1969 film Destiny of My Load
 Portrayed by Yoon Jeong-hee in the 1971 film The Women of Gyeongbokgung
 Portrayed by Kim Yeong-ae in the 1973 MBC TV series Queen Min
 Portrayed by Do Geum-bong in the 1973 film Three Days of Their Reign
 Portrayed by Kang Soo-yeon and Kim Yeong-ae in the 1982 KBS1 TV series Wind and Cloud
 Portrayed by Kim Ji-sook in the 1989–1990 KBS2 TV series Wind, Clouds, and Rain
 Portrayed by Kim Hee-ae in the 1990 MBC TV series 500 Years of Joseon: Daewongun
 Portrayed by Ha Hee-ra in the 1995–1996 KBS1 TV series Dazzling Dawn
 Portrayed by Moon Geun-young, Lee Mi-yeon and Choi Myung-gil in the 2001–2002 KBS2 TV series Empress Myeongseong.
 Portrayed by Soo Ae in the 2009 film The Sword With No Name.
 Portrayed by Kang Soo-yeon in the 2006 film Hanbando
 Portrayed by Seo Yi-sook in the 2010 SBS TV series Jejungwon.
 Portrayed by Ha Ji-eun in the 2014 KBS2 TV series Gunman in Joseon.
 Portrayed by Choi Ji-na in the 2015 KBS2 TV series The Merchant: Gaekju 2015
 Portrayed by Lee Yoon-jeong in the 2015 film The Sound of a Flower
 Portrayed by Kim Ji-hyeon in the 2019 SBS TV series Nokdu Flower
 Portrayed by Park Jung-yeon in the 2020 TV Chosun TV series Kingmaker: The Change of Destiny
 Portrayed by Cha Ji-yeon in the 2021 film Lost Face

Musicals
 The Last Empress (musical)

See also
 Japanese Occupation of Gyeongbokgung Palace
 Empress Myeongseong (TV drama)
 The Last Empress (Musical)
 History of Korea
 Joseon Dynasty
 Heungseon Daewongun
 Emperor Gojong of the Korean Empire
 Korea royal refuge at the Russian legation
 Afanasy Ivanovich Seredin-Sabatin 
Queen Wongyeong – Myeongseong's ascendant through her father
 Queen Inhyeon – Myeongseong's ascendant through her father (Min Chi-rok).

Notes

References

Further reading
 Bird, Isabella. (1898). Korea and her Neighbours. London: Murray. OCLC 501671063. Reprinted 1987: ; OCLC 15109843
 Dechler, Martina. (1999). Culture and the State in Late Choson Korea. 
 Duus, Peter. (1998). The Abacus and the Sword: The Japanese Penetration of Korea, 1895–1910. Berkeley: University of California Press. /; 
 Han, Young-woo, Empress Myeongseong and Korean Empire (명성황후와 대한제국)(2001). Hyohyeong Publishing 
 Hann, Woo-Keun. (1996). The History of Korea. 
 Keene, Donald. (2002). Emperor of Japan: Meiji and His World, 1852–1912. New York: Columbia University Press. ; OCLC 46731178
 Lewis, James Bryant. (2003). Frontier Contact between Choson Korea and Tokugawa Japan. 
 MacKensie, Frederick Arthur. (1920). Korea's Fight for Freedom. Chicago: Fleming H. Revell. OCLC 3124752 Revised 2006:  (See also Project Gutenberg.)
 __. (1908). The Tragedy of Korea. London: Hodder and Stoughton. OCLC 2008452 Reprinted 2006: 
 Nahm, Andrew C. (1996). A History of the Korean People: Tradition and Transformation. (1996) 
 _. (1997). Introduction to Korean History and Culture. 
 Schmid, Andre. (2002). Korea between Empires, 1895–1919. New York: Columbia University Press. ; ; OCLC 48618117
 Andrews, William. (2018) The Dragon Queen. (Fiction) Amazon Publishing.

External links

 Making of an Asian hit: A Korean royal tragedy in the Broadway style by Ricardo Saludo, Asia Week (18 December 1998)
 Characteristics of Queen of Corea, The New York Times, 10 November 1895.
 Japanese Document Sheds New Light on Korean Queen's Murder by Yoo Seok-jae, The Chosun Ilbo (12 January 2005)
 

Joseon Buddhists
1851 births
1895 deaths
Korean posthumous empresses
Korean Buddhist monarchs
House of Yi
Assassinated royalty
Anti-Japanese sentiment in Korea
Assassinated Korean people
People murdered in Korea
19th-century Korean people
19th-century Korean women
Royal consorts of the Joseon dynasty
Korean queens consort
Yeoheung Min clan
Female murder victims
Violence against women in Asia
Regents of Korea
1895 murders in Asia
People from Yeoju
Deaths by stabbing